Maksim Avgustinovich (born 20 August 2003) is a Belarusian professional footballer who plays for Smorgon.

References

External links 
 
 

2003 births
Living people
People from Smarhon’
Sportspeople from Grodno Region
Belarusian footballers
Association football defenders
FC Smorgon players